Stephen Alexander Vaden (born May 15, 1982) is a judge of the United States Court of International Trade.

Education 

Vaden graduated from Union City High School as the valedictorian of the class of 2000. He earned a Bachelor of Arts from Vanderbilt University and a Juris Doctor from Yale Law School.

Legal career 

After graduating from law school, Vaden served as a law clerk to Judge Julia Smith Gibbons of the United States Court of Appeals for the Sixth Circuit and to Judge Samuel H. Mays Jr. of the United States District Court for the Western District of Tennessee. Vaden has practiced law at Patton Boggs and Jones Day, specializing in appellate litigation, election law, and administrative law.

General Counsel of the Department of Agriculture 

Vaden served on the Trump administration's United States Department of Agriculture landing team. He was appointed Principal Deputy General Counsel of the department on March 17, 2017, succeeding Lee Fink.

On September 2, 2017, Vaden was nominated to be the General Counsel for the United States Department of Agriculture. He was confirmed by the United States Senate, 53–46, on November 27, 2018, and was sworn in on December 14, 2018. He left the Department after being commissioned as a Judge of the Court of International Trade.

Trade Court service 

On October 2, 2019, President Trump announced his intent to nominate Vaden to the United States Court of International Trade. On October 17, 2019, his nomination was sent to the Senate. President Trump nominated Vaden to the seat vacated by Judge Delissa A. Ridgway, who assumed senior status on January 31, 2019. A hearing on his nomination before the Senate Judiciary Committee was held on November 13, 2019. On January 3, 2020, his nomination was returned to the President under Rule XXXI, Paragraph 6 of the United States Senate. Later that day, he was re-nominated to the same seat. On January 16, 2020, his nomination was reported out of committee by a 12–10 vote. On November 18, 2020, the Senate invoked cloture on his nomination by a 49–44 vote. His nomination was confirmed later that day by a 49–43 vote. He received his judicial commission on December 21, 2020.

References

External links 
 
 S. Hrg. 115-602 - NOMINATION HEARING: GLEN SMITH, TO BE A MEMBER OF THE FARM CREDIT ADMINISTRATION BOARD, FARM CREDIT UNION, AND STEPHEN ALEXANDER VADEN, TO BE GENERAL COUNSEL OF THE DEPARTMENT OF AGRICULTURE 

|-

1982 births
Living people
21st-century American lawyers
21st-century American judges
Federalist Society members
Jones Day people
Judges of the United States Court of International Trade
Lawyers from Washington, D.C.
People from Memphis, Tennessee
Tennessee lawyers
Tennessee Republicans
Trump administration personnel
United States Department of Agriculture officials
Vanderbilt University alumni
Yale Law School alumni
United States federal judges appointed by Donald Trump